Theobald II (1221– October 1291) was a count of Bar.  He was the son of Henry II of Bar and Philippa of Dreux.  He became count of Bar when his father was killed during the Barons' Crusade in 1239, but news of Henry's death did not reach him until 1240. As Theobald was still a minor, his mother ruled as regent until 17 March 1242. Theobald's own children included his successor Henry III and the bishop Reginald of Bar.

Marriage 

Theobald II married twice, first in 1245 to Joan, daughter of William II of Dampierre and Margaret II, Countess of Flanders. They were betrothed on 3 May 1243 and married two years later, in March 1245 or on 31 August 1245. The marriage was brief and childless. The next year, in 1246, Theobald married Jeanne de Toucy, daughter of John, lord of Toucy, Saint-Fargeau and Puisaye and his wife Emma de Laval.

Issue 

His children with Jeanne de Toucy were:
 Henry of Bar, succeeded his father as Henry III, Count of Bar; married Eleanor of England
 John of Bar, married Jeanne of Dreux, daughter of Robert IV of Dreux and Beatrice, Countess of Montfort
 Charles of Bar, died young
 Theobald of Bar, elected Bishop of Metz in 1296; bishop of Liège in 1302; killed in battle in Rome on 26 May 1312; buried at St Peter's, Rome
 Reginald of Bar, canon at Reims, Beauvais, Cambrai, Laon and Verdun; archdeacon at Brussels and Besançon; bishop of Metz in 1302; death by poisoning
 Erard of Bar, was a monk by 1292 and then seigneur de Pierrepont et d'Ancerville by 1302; married Isabelle of Lorraine, daughter of Theobald II, Duke of Lorraine, and Isabelle de Rumigny; had six children
 Peter of Bar, seigneur de Pierrefort in 1300; Herr zu Bettingen ("seigneur of Bettingen"), 1326/1334; married firstly Jeanne de Vienne, daughter of Hugues de Vienne, Sire de Longwy et de Pagny (grandson of Isabella of Burgundy); had four children with first wife; married secondly, Eleonore de Poitiers-Valentinois
 Philippa of Bar, married Otto IV, Count of Burgundy
 Alice of Bar, married Matthias of Lorraine, seigneur de Beauregard, son of Frederick III, Duke of Lorraine
 Mary of Bar, married Gobert, Sire d'Aspremont
 Isabelle of Bar
 Yolanda of Bar
 Margaret of Bar, abbess of Saint-Maur à Verdun
 Philip of Bar
 Henrietta of Bar

References

Sources

1221 births
1291 deaths
Counts of Bar